Europactor Algeria Spa. is the fruit of the partnership between the Algerian Company Sofare Spa.  Which is a subsidiary of The Enmtp Group and the Spanish firm Europactor S.L

History
In January 2008 the Enmtp start negotiation with the Europactor S.L based in Zaragoza, to create a new company based in Aïn Smara Constantine, in April of the same year the pact of shareholders has been signed SOFARE Spa has (60%) and Europactor S.L (40%). 
In 2013 the factory was ready and started manufacturing several models of Road rollers.
In 2016 the production is expected to reach 460 vehicles/year.

Models
The Aïn Smara facility manufacture several models for several duty Five types of Single drum compactors, from 3 to 20 tons, and one type of compactors double drum 12 tons, All the models are equipped with engines of the new range of water-cooled engines from the engines manufacturing company of Oued Hamimine in Constantine.

Road rollers Single drum 
R 703
R 712
R 716
R 718
R 720

Road rollers Double drum 
TV-219-DT

References

Companies established in 2013
Companies based in Constantine, Algeria
Government-owned companies of Algeria
Algerian brands
ENMTP
2013 establishments in Algeria

Companies of Algeria